Kenya's forests are fragmented across the country. Combined, forests cover over 37 million hectares. Out of those 37 million hectares, 2.1 million are woodlands, 24.8 million are bush lands and 10.7 are wooded grasslands. Kenya's forests are important at a global level as they host 1847 species of amphibians, birds, mammals, and reptiles of which 4% are only found in Kenya. Beyond its fauna, Kenya's forest also hosts 6505 types of vascular plants, with 4.1% only being found in Kenya. Today Kenya faces high rates of deforestation which endanger both its fauna and flora. It has been estimated that since Kenya's independence in 1963, the forest cover has dropped from 10% of the nation to 6%, losing approximately 12,000 hectares annually. These levels of deforestation have impacted Kenya as they rely on the forest for the storage of rainwater, the prevention of flooding, the fertility of the soil, and the regulation of climate conditions. The World War II period and its aftermath made it clear to British colonial administration that reform was needed to sustain Kenyan forests. One of the first steps for conservation took place with the 1941 revision of the Forest Ordinance that passed legislation to create forest reserves and create a committee with professionals on matters of conservation. By 1950, the forest department had gained control of 100,000 acres, but it had a difficult time sustaining the conservation of these areas; it required meaningful policy to meet the constant attention these areas needed.

As the independence of Kenya approached, its forest continued to degrade in part due to the land demand from the growing population. By the beginning of the 19th century, the population in Kenya stood at 1,7 million, which increased to 8.5 million by 1962. The desired land that could be used for farming was in the forests; thus, deforestation increased. Demand for wood fuel increased in urban areas such as Nairobi, Kisumu, and Mombasa. After Kenya gained its independence in 1963, the efforts to resolve deforestation continued but fell short. Some of the methods taken during the period included the recruitment of Canadian and British experts to manage the forest. The Canadian Overseas Assistance Programme assisted Kenya by training its foresters and provided a 5-week tour in Canadian forests to Kenyan conservators, as both share the timber industry.

Contemporary causes
For the last two decades, the challenges Kenyan Forest faces are still similar to its long history of deforestation. Some of the current drivers that are increasing deforestation categorize into technological, economic, and cultural types. The drivers that are qualified as technological are mostly the lack of knowledge about the impacts of deforestation and the lack of appropriate technology required for three growing.  The economic drivers are poverty leading to reliance on charcoal fuel and the usage of woodland for crops. As for the cultural challenges, one can classify the usage of fire for land clearing and the inability to control these fires.

Agricultural expansion continues to impact the Mau forest in Kenya. The area experiences massive deforestation to grow commercial tea and wheat. The forest of Migori and more western areas use the land for sugar, while forest in areas in Nyanza is used for tobacco.  Wood extraction also contributes to deforestation, but data has been systematically not collected by the Kenya Forest Service and the Ministry of Energy to prevent it from stopping. Most of the deforestation by wood extraction occurs in the dry woodlands of the coast, while wood extraction for charcoal and fuel occurs on locations nearby metropolitan areas where the demand exists.  Another factor that contributes to the deforestation in Kenya is infrastructural developments. Roads, railways, and dams lead to deforestation as they create new settlements that cause a demand in land and resources from the forested areas.

Measured rates of deforestation 

During the last two decades of the 21st century, Kenya's rate of deforestation has remained consistent. The first decade of the century experienced 2,914.55 hectares in a primary forest lost and 19,401 hectares lost in tree cover while the second decade of the century has experienced a total of 2,099.74 hectares lost in primary forest and 17,167 hectares lost in tree cover.

Impacts 

The impact of deforestation in the Kenyan water has been one of the most notorious; This is present in lake Naivasha and its surrounding communities. Lake Naivasha, located west of Nairobi, receives its water from the Aberdare Range where the rivers and streams that originate in the mountains are the source of water in the lakes. The forest in the Aberdares mountains traps moisture and keeps temperatures cool, provides cloud cover, and creates the rainfall that feeds the streams and rivers. The high levels of deforestation in the area have interrupted this natural cycle and affected several lakes such as Naivasha. With many trees in the Aberdares mountains gone, the forest is no longer trapping moisture or creating rainfall; thus, the water levels in Lake Naivasha have decreased. The scarcity of water has directly impacted flora and fauna of the region and also impacted local communities whose source of water is lakes such as Naivasha.

Deforestation in Kenya, specifically in the Mara river basin, has also caused soil erosion and an increase in flooding. Deforestation increases land erosion because forests help hold in place essential nutrients in the soil. From the early ’70s to the early 2000s, the savannah, grassland, and shrub-land in the Mara river basin have decreased by 27% in part due to agricultural land usages doubling during the same period. As a result, land erosion has increased in the upper catchment area while lower areas have experienced an increase in flood by 7% and a 387% increase in Mara wetland during the same period that deforestation increased.

The high rates of deforestation have increased temperatures in Kenya, thus also increasing the likelihood of malaria transmission. Deforestation rates in western Kenyan highlands directly affect the temperature in the area and alter the larval habitat, thus increasing their chances of survival and development. Deforested areas in western Kenyan highlands have increased in temperature by  0.5 °C in 10 months while the average temperature of houses in the area has increased 1.8 and 1.2 °C during the same period. Additionally, the deforested areas are used for Maize cultivation in which larvae can feed and, as a result, grow into more significant adults and increase the likelihood of transmission. These conditions directly doubled rates of malaria mosquitos in Kenya from 0.22 to 0.33 and during the rainy season from 0.1 to 0.12, representing a 50% increase in the dry season and a 20% increase during the rainy season.

Response 

As a result of high deforestation rates and its negative impacts, the Kenyan government has made efforts to stop it. The first signs of forest conservation in Kenya happened in 1957 with a policy that sought to preserve the forest in order to protect water catchments and promote sustainable development of the forest industry. As a result of research and detailed data, in the early 2000s, the Kenyan government further pursued the protection of forests by enacting a policy that both addresses socioeconomic and environmental challenges. One of the most notorious examples being the 2005 Forest Act that continues to be an example of forest policy today. The 2005 Forest Act required public participation and collaboration with local communities to develop forest management plants while respecting their cultural traditions. In addition, the 2005 forest act acknowledged the ability of sustainable practices to reduce poverty and sustain necessary environmental resources.

More recently the Kenyan government has sought new legislation that further incorporates local communities and promotes economic development. Some critical aspects of today's forest reform include the creation of the Kenya Forest Service, public and professional involvement in resource management, creation of a conservation fund, and conservation of the complete forest ecosystem, which includes water, flora, and fauna.  Additionally, other forest conservation efforts have been implemented with agricultural reform.  The Kenyan Agriculture act included new measures that required every agricultural landholder to conserve 10% of forest cover in their land.

See also
 Environmental issues in Kenya
 Corruption in Kenya

References

Deforestation by region
Forestry in Kenya